The Commandant of the Defence Services Staff College is the head and overall in-charge of the Defence Services Staff College. The Commandant of the Academy is a Three-star rank officer from the Indian Army. He is supported by the chief instructors of the Army, Navy and Air wings, Major General in charge of Administration (MG IC Adm) (all two-star rank appointments), Brigadier General Staff (one-star appointment) and a staff officer (SO to Comdt) (an officer of the rank of major).

The Commandant is responsible to the Chiefs of Staff Committee through the Chairman of the Joint Training Committee.

Lieutenant General S Mohan, AVSM, SM, VSM is the present Commandant of the DSSC. He assumed office on 1 February 2022 from Lieutenant General MJS Kahlon.

History
The College was established in 1905 in Quetta (now in Pakistan). After the partition of India and Pakistan, the Indian elements of the Staff College, Quetta led by Colonel S D Verma moved to India. Promoted Brigadier and appointed as the First Commandant, Verma chose Wellington as the location of the Staff College in India. In 1948, Major General W D A Lentaigne, CB, CBE, DSO took over as the Commandant, the longest serving Commandant till date.

The appointment was upgraded to the Three-star rank of Lieutenant General in 1981.

List of Commandants

See also
 Commandant of the National Defence College
 Commandant of Indian Naval Academy
 Commandant of the Indian Military Academy

References

Lists of Indian military personnel
Military academies of India
Indian military appointments
Indian Army appointments